Tarek El Ashry is an Egyptian football coach who is the current manager of the Egyptian Premier League team Pharco. He established his name as a young manager by winning three cup titles. In addition, he is considered to be the first manager to implement a 4-4-2 formation in Egyptian football successfully.

Coaching career
Tarek El Ashry's coaching career was shaped by the Egyptian team Haras El Hodood (a.k.a. Border Guards) a team that had a relatively low profile when El Ashry took charge. He led the team to its first ever title in winning the 2008–09 Egypt Cup where Haras El Hodood defeated ENNPI 4–1 on penalties after a 1–1 tie. As the cup winners, Haras El Hodood faced the league champions, Al Ahly, in the 2009 Egyptian Super Cup where they managed to turn out winners by a 2–0 margin, winning  the club's second trophy. El Ashry successfully defended his team's cup title in the 2009–10 Egypt Cup Final where Haras El Hodood beat Al Ahly 5–4 on penalties following a 1–1 tie.

El Ahry also led Haras El Hodood in continental competition as the team appeared several times in the CAF Confederation Cup; the  2006 edition being its first. The team's best result was in the 2008 CAF Confederation Cup where it finished in 2nd place in the group stage.

Managerial statistics

Honours

As a coach
Haras El Hodood
Egypt Cup: 2008–09, 2009–10
Egyptian Super Cup: 2009–10

References

1964 births
Living people
Egyptian footballers
Association football defenders
Egypt international footballers
Al Ittihad Alexandria Club players
Egyptian football managers
Haras El Hodoud SC managers
ENPPI SC managers
Al-Ahly SC (Benghazi) managers
Al-Shaab CSC managers
Al Mokawloon Al Arab SC managers
Al-Hilal Club (Omdurman) managers
Al-Ahli SC (Tripoli) managers
Wadi Degla SC managers
Al Masry SC managers
Tala'ea El Gaish SC managers
Smouha SC managers
Egyptian expatriate football managers
Expatriate football managers in Libya
Egyptian expatriate sportspeople in Libya
Expatriate football managers in the United Arab Emirates
Egyptian expatriate sportspeople in the United Arab Emirates
Expatriate football managers in Sudan
Egyptian expatriate sportspeople in Sudan